Medis may refer to:
Médis, a commune in Nouvelle-Aquitaine, France
A colloquial name for Medborgarplatsen, a square in Stockholm, Sweden